Huili (fl. 320s AD) was an Indian Buddhist monk and pilgrim who founded the Lingyin Temple in Hangzhou, which is now one of the holiest Buddhist shrines of China. His Indian name is uncertain, but possibly Matiyukti. He arrived in Hangzhou in 326 AD.

References

Indian Buddhist missionaries
4th-century Buddhists
Indian emigrants to China
Jin dynasty (266–420) Buddhist monks
People from Hangzhou
Missionary linguists